State Road 291 (SR 291) is a major thoroughfare in the Pensacola, Florida metropolitan area. Locally, it is known as Davis Street and Davis Highway. It runs from Wright Street in downtown Pensacola north to its terminus at Nine Mile Road (U.S. Highway 90 Alternate or US 90 Alt.) near the University of West Florida.  Between Fairfield Drive (State Road 295) and University Parkway, Davis is one of the city's major commercial strips.  Near its intersection with Interstate 10 (I-10) lies University Mall.

For a time at least during the early 1950s, US 90 was routed along SR 291 north of Cervantes Street.

Major intersections

References

External links

Southeastroads.com guide to State Road 291

291
291